Yves Pouliquen (17 February 1931 – 5 February 2020) was a French ophthalmologist. His work focused on the pathology of the cornea.

Pouliquen was born in Mortain. In 1992, he was made a member of the Académie nationale de médecine.  In 1994 he was awarded the Prix mondial Cino Del Duca and on 29 November 2001 he was elected to the Académie Française.  Since 2006, he was the president of the Fondation Singer-Polignac.

In 2000, Pouliquen was featured in the documentary film Vies.
He was a member of the International Review Board of the Japanese Journal of Ophthalmology.

Bibliography
1967  La Transparence de la cornée  (Masson)
1969  Atlas d'histologie et d'ultrastructure de l'œil  (Masson)
1973  Les Homogreffes de la cornée  (Masson)
1974  Les Lentilles souples  (Masson)
1983  L'Herpès de la cornée, précis d'ophtalmologie  (Masson)
1990  La Cataracte  (Hermann)
1992  La Transparence de l'œil  (Odile Jacob)
1995  Les Yeux de l'autre  (Odile Jacob)
1999  Un oculiste au temps des lumières  (Odile Jacob)
2003  Le Geste et l'esprit  (Odile Jacob)
2006  Mme de Sévigné et la médecine du grand siècle  (Odile Jacob)

References

External links
 L'Académie française  

 Yves Pouliquen lutte contre la cécité en Afrique – Le Figaro 
Publications by Odile Jacob

1931 births
2020 deaths
Members of the Académie Française
Lycée Louis-le-Grand alumni
University of Paris alumni
French ophthalmologists
People from Manche
Grand Officiers of the Légion d'honneur
Grand Officers of the Ordre national du Mérite
Member of the Academy of the Kingdom of Morocco